The Embassy of the Republic of Iceland in Moscow is the diplomatic mission of Iceland in the Russian Federation. The embassy is also accredited to Armenia, Belarus, Kazakhstan, Kyrgyzstan, Moldova, Tajikistan, Turkmenistan, and Uzbekistan. It is located at 28 Khlebny Lane in the Presnensky District of Moscow. The current ambassador is Árni Þór Sigurðsson.

See also
 Iceland–Russia relations
 Diplomatic missions in Russia

References

External links
  Embassy of Iceland in Moscow

Iceland–Russia relations
Iceland
Moscow
Cultural heritage monuments of regional significance in Moscow